Androgen suppression is a medical treatment to suppress or block the production or action of male sex hormones, typically in order to attempt to treat certain types of cancer that rely upon male hormones for its growth.

This is done by having the testicles removed, by taking female sex hormones, or by taking drugs called antiandrogens.

See also
 Castration
 Chemical castration

References

Endocrine procedures